Belgium's Strongest Man is an annual strongman competition held in Belgium and featuring exclusively Belgian athletes. The contest was established in 2008. Jimmy Laureys holds the record for most wins with 5 wins.

It is a multi event competition that tests competitors in a number of different fields.

Top 3 placings

References

External links 
Official site

National strongmen competitions
National championships in Belgium
2008 establishments in Belgium
Recurring sporting events established in 2008